"Suspended in Gaffa" is a song recorded by English art rock singer Kate Bush. It was the fourth single release from her album The Dreaming. "Suspended in Gaffa" was released as a single in continental Europe and Australia, but not in the UK.

The song lyrics are about seeing something one really wants (God in this case), then not being able to see or experience it ever again. The "gaffa" of the title and chorus refers to gaffer tape, the strong matte black tape used by technicians in the film and concert industries.

The B-side is the original mix of "Ne t'enfuis pas", which is misspelled on the original sleeve as "Ne T'en Fui Pas", and was only released on a handful of singles in late 1982. "Ne t'enfuis pas" is a French phrase which means "don't run away". In some countries, the B-side was "Dreamtime" (which originally appeared as the B-side to "The Dreaming").

Music video
A music video was produced for the song, which features Bush performing an interpretive dance in what appears to be a barn.

Personnel
 Kate Bush – vocals, piano, strings
 Del Palmer – bass guitar
 Stuart Elliott – drums, sticks
 Paddy Bush – mandolin, strings
 Dave Lawson – synclavier

Charts

Covers
A cover of "Suspended in Gaffa" appears on Syracuse-based indie rock band Ra Ra Riot's debut album The Rhumb Line.

The song was also covered by garage rock band The Figgs on their 2019 album Shady Grove.

In popular culture
Rec.music.gaffa has been the name for the Kate Bush Usenet newsgroup since 16 August 1985, and is now resident at Google Groups and other Kate-Bush-related websites.

"Kate Boosh" by Brooklyn-based rapper Himanshu "Heems" Suri samples the two-line post-chorus vocal of this song and co-opts it as a chorus. The song appears on Suri's 2012 mixtape Nehru Jackets.

References

1982 singles
Kate Bush songs
Songs written by Kate Bush
1982 songs